Fate of Nations is the sixth studio album by English singer Robert Plant, released 25 May 1993 on Es Paranza Records in North America and Fontana Records internationally. It features former Cutting Crew guitarist Kevin MacMichael on all songs and as well as being a backing vocalist. In addition, the album also features violinist Nigel Kennedy on one song. The song "I Believe" is a tribute to Plant's late son, Karac. The album was Plant's last solo album until his comeback with his seventh studio album Dreamland in 2002.

Background 
Plant explained his album in the following terms:

Reissues 
Fate of Nations was remastered and reissued by Rhino Records on 20 March 2007, this edition included 5 bonus tracks. In April 2019, the album was reissued on vinyl for Record Store Day 2019.

Track listing

Personnel
 Maartin Allcock – mandolin on "If I Were a Carpenter"; all instruments except drums and vocals on "Colours of a Shade"
 Phillip Andrews – keyboards on "Memory Song (Hello Hello)"
 Chris Blackwell – drums on "Promised Land"
 Doug Boyle – guitar on "29 Palms", "Network News"
 Máire Brennan – backing vocals on "Come into My Life"
 Francis Dunnery – guitar on "Come into My Life", "Promised Land"
 Nigel Eaton – hurdy-gurdy on "Come into My Life", "I Believe"
 John Flynn – backing vocals on "The Greatest Gift"
 Steve French – backing vocals on "I Believe"
 Chris Hughes – drums on "Down to the Sea", "Come into My Life", "I Believe", "29 Palms", "If I Were a Carpenter", "Promised Land", "The Greatest Gift", "Network News"
 Phil Johnstone – harmonium on "Come into My Life"; piano on "I Believe", "29 Palms", "Memory Song (Hello Hello)", "If I Were a Carpenter"; organ on "Promised Land"; electric piano on "The Greatest Gift", "Great Spirit"; backing vocals on "Great Spirit"; electric orchestra on "Network News"
 Charlie Jones – bass on all songs; all instruments except guitar and drums on "Down to the Sea"
 Nigel Kennedy – violin on "Calling to You"
 Navazish Ali Khan – violin on "Network News"
 Michael Lee – drums on "Memory Song (Hello Hello)", "Network News"
 Kevin Scott MacMichael – guitar on all songs; backing vocals on "I Believe"
 Lynton Naiff – String arrangement on "If I Were a Carpenter", "The Greatest Gift"
 Robert Plant – lead vocals; guitar on "Promised Land"; backing vocals on "Great Spirit"
 Gurdev Singh – dilruba & sarod on "Network News"
 Surge Singh – sarangi on "Network News"
 Julian Taylor – backing vocals on "I Believe"
 Richard Thompson – guitar on "Come into My Life"
 Pete Thompson – drums on "Calling to You", "Come into My Life", "The Greatest Gift", "Great Spirit"
 Oliver J. Woods – guitar on "Down to the Sea", "Memory Song (Hello Hello)"

Production

 Henry Binns – engineer
 Julian Broad – photography
 Cally – sleeve design
 John Cornfield – engineer
 Ross Cullum – engineer
 Andy Earl – photography
 Michael Gregovich – engineer, mixer
 Chris Hughes – producer
 Pete Lewis – engineer
 Mark O'Donoughue – engineer
 Tim Palmer – mixer
 Robert Plant – producer
 Danton Supple – engineer
 Jacquie Turner – engineer
Anthony Petrecca

Charts

Certifications

References

1993 albums
Albums produced by Chris Hughes (musician)
Robert Plant albums